Costantino is both a masculine Italian given name and an Italian surname. Notable people with the name include:

People with the given name
Costantino Affer (1906–1987), Italian medallist
Costantino Barbella (1853–1925), Italian sculptor
Costantino Bresciani Turroni (1882–1963), Italian economist and statistician
Costantino de Castro, 11th-century Italian Roman Catholic bishop
Costantino Catena (born 1969), Italian classical pianist
Costantino Cedini (1741–1811), Italian painter
Costantino Corti, 19th-century Italian sculptor
Costantino D'Orazio (born 1974), Italian art critic and curator
Costantino Fiaschetti, 18th-century Italian architect
Costantino De Giacomo, Italian physician
Costantino Lazzari (1857–1927), Italian politician
Costantino Nigra (1828–1907), Italian diplomat
Costantino Nivola (1911–1988), Italian sculptor
Costantino Pasqualotto (1681–1755), Italian painter
Costantino Patrizi Naro (1798–1876), Italian cardinal
Costantino Rocca (born 1956), Italian golfer
Costantino Sala (born 1913), Italian footballer
Costantino Sereno (1829–1893), Italian painter

People with the surname
Damian Costantino (born c. 1978), American baseball player
Gregory Costantino (born 1960), American politician
Marco Costantino (born 1991), Italian footballer
Mark Americus Costantino (1920–1990), American judge
Normando Costantino (born 1952), Argentine Air Force brigadier
Raffaele Costantino (1907–1991), Italian footballer
Romola Costantino (1930–1988), Australian pianist
Rosario Costantino (footballer, born 1997), Italian football player
Sharon Costantino (born 1975), Maltese footballer
Steven M. Costantino (born 1957), American politician
Tommaso Costantino (1885–1950), Italian fencer

See also
Costantino Lake, a lake in Calabria, Italy
Constantine (disambiguation)
San Costantino (disambiguation)

Italian-language surnames
Italian masculine given names
Patronymic surnames